Stepson are a five-piece Australian melodic hardcore band formed in 2014 in Brisbane. They released their debut studio album Help Me, Help You in March 2021.

History
The band released their debut six-track EP Broken Bottles / Drunken Hearts in 2014.
This was followed with a second six-track Echoes in an Empty Room in 2015 and with the three-track EP The Beautiful Lie in 2016.
 
The band released their debut studio album Help Me, Help You in March 2021 on American label, SharpTone Records, becoming the label's first album released globally by an Australian artist.

Band members
 Brock Alan Conry – vocals
 Jayden Ridley – bass, vocals
 Nick Bennett – guitars
 Nickolas Sean Farr – guitars
 Jordan McDonald – drums

Discography

Studio albums

Extended plays

References

 Melodic hardcore groups
Musical groups from Brisbane
Musical groups established in 2014
2014 establishments in Australia